Joseph Adam "J. D." Durbin (born February 24, 1982), is an American former professional baseball pitcher who played in Major League Baseball (MLB) for the Minnesota Twins, Arizona Diamondbacks, and the Philadelphia Phillies, in Nippon Professional Baseball (NPB) for the Fukuoka SoftBank Hawks, and in the Chinese Professional Baseball League (CPBL) for the Lamigo Monkeys.

Career

"The Real Deal"
Durbin was drafted by the Minnesota Twins in 2000 in the second round (54th overall) out of Coronado High School in Arizona where he played baseball and football. Durbin, whose self-appointed/coach aided nickname, (thanks to Al Newman), at one time was "the Real Deal", was the Twins Minor League Player of the Year in 2002 after compiling an 13–4 record with 163 strikeouts for the Quad City River Bandits of the Midwest League. The following season, he was the starting pitcher in the Florida State League all-star game, and pitched in the All-Star Futures Game.

MLB debut
Durbin made his MLB debut on September 8, 2004, pitching in relief, and made his first career start on September 23 against the Cleveland Indians. In three innings pitched, he gave up seven hits and five earned runs and took his only loss for the season.

Durbin was ranked the #70th best prospect by "Baseball America" in 2005 and the Twins second best pitcher behind Jesse Crain. However, he did not play in the majors during the 2005 and 2006 seasons. He had gone 4–3 with an 2.33 ERA in 16 starts for Triple-A Rochester before being sidelined for the rest of the 2006 season on July 5 with right biceps musculocutaneous neuropathy.

Philadelphia Phillies
Durbin, who was cleared to start throwing on February 1, 2007, did not fare well coming off his injury. During spring training in 2007, he went 0–2 with an 11.25 ERA in seven relief appearances for the Twins and was claimed off waivers by the Arizona Diamondbacks on March 29. He appeared in one game for the D-Backs out of the bullpen on April 4 against the Colorado Rockies, and gave up seven runs in ⅔ of an inning. The following day he was designated for assignment. He was claimed off waivers by the Boston Red Sox on April 10, and designated for assignment on the very same day. The Philadelphia Phillies then claimed Durbin from the Red Sox on April 13. He would be designated for assignment on April 17 and was out-righted to Triple-A Ottawa the next day.

Durbin was called back up to the majors, and made his first start for the Phillies against the New York Mets on June 29. In  innings, he gave up all six runs in the Mets' 6–5 victory. He earned his first major league win on July 17, 2007, against the Los Angeles Dodgers where he pitched six innings and gave up one run. He also got his first three major league hits in the same game. In his next start on July 22, 2007, he pitched his first major league complete game shutout against the San Diego Padres throwing 109 pitches, with 71 for strikes against 38 balls.

Durbin failed to make the club in spring training 2008, and on March 18, the Phillies out-righted Durbin to the minors. He split the season between the Double-A Reading Phillies and the Triple-A Lehigh Valley IronPigs, going 5–14 with an 5.82 ERA.

Los Angeles Dodgers
Durbin became a free agent at the end of the season and was signed by the Los Angeles Dodgers to a minor league contract in 2009. He made his debut with the Southern League Chattanooga Lookouts on May 4, pitching three scoreless innings in relief. His first start came on May 23, against the Carolina Mudcats. He was solid, giving up only one earned run on three hits and one walk in four innings, yet he took the loss. On July 17, he was promoted to the Triple-a Albuquerque Isotopes, with whom he went 0–6 with an 6.43 ERA.

Fukuoka SoftBank Hawks
On May 2, 2010, Durbin signed to play in Japan for the Fukuoka SoftBank Hawks.

Olmecas de Tabasco
On May 22, 2011, Durbin signed to play in Mexico for the Olmecas de Tabasco in the LMB.

Lancaster Barnstormers
On June 18, 2011, Durbin signed to play in Lancaster, Pennsylvania for the Barnstormers in the Atlantic League.

Lamigo Monkeys
On May 27, 2013, Durbin signed to play for the Lamigo Monkeys in the CPBL(Taiwan).

References

External links

J. D. Durbin at Pura Pelota (Venezuelan Professional Baseball League)

1982 births
Living people
Albuquerque Isotopes players
American expatriate baseball players in Canada
American expatriate baseball players in Japan
American expatriate baseball players in Taiwan
Arizona Diamondbacks players
Baseball players from Oregon
Cangrejeros de Santurce (baseball) players
Chattanooga Lookouts players
Elizabethton Twins players
Fort Myers Miracle players
Fukuoka SoftBank Hawks players
Grand Canyon Rafters players
Gulf Coast Twins players
Lamigo Monkeys players
Lancaster Barnstormers players
Lehigh Valley IronPigs players
Leones de Yucatán players
Liga de Béisbol Profesional Roberto Clemente pitchers
Major League Baseball pitchers
Mexican League baseball pitchers
Minnesota Twins players
New Britain Rock Cats players
Nippon Professional Baseball pitchers
Olmecas de Tabasco players
Ottawa Lynx players
Philadelphia Phillies players
Quad City River Bandits players
Reading Phillies players
Rochester Red Wings players
Tiburones de La Guaira players
American expatriate baseball players in Venezuela
Tigres de Aragua players